is a Japanese footballer currently playing as a midfielder for Azul Claro Numazu.

Career statistics

Club
.

Notes

References

External links

1996 births
Living people
People from Yaizu, Shizuoka
Association football people from Shizuoka Prefecture
Japanese footballers
Association football midfielders
J3 League players
Azul Claro Numazu players